"Soulful Old Man Sunshine" is a song by the American rock band the Beach Boys that was recorded during the sessions for their 1970 album Sunflower. It was written by Brian Wilson and Rick Henn, former leader of the Sunrays. The song was recorded on November 6 and 9, 1969, but was not released until the 1998 compilation Endless Harmony Soundtrack.  Endless Harmony Soundtrack also featured an edit of the songwriting session/demo recording made by Brian. The master recording was also included on the 2013 box set Made in California. An alternate version of this song was released on the 2021 box set Feel Flows.

Cover version
 1992 –  Manfred Schmidt, In My Room

See also
 List of unreleased songs recorded by the Beach Boys

References

External links
 
 

1998 songs
The Beach Boys songs
Songs written by Brian Wilson
Song recordings produced by Brian Wilson
Songs released posthumously